Novy Kalchir (Yañı Kälser) is a rural locality (a village) and the administrative centre of Novokalchirovsky Selsoviet, Aurgazinsky District, Bashkortostan, Russia. The population was 187 as of 2010. There are 2 streets.

Geography 
Novy Kalchir is located 8 km north of Tolbazy (the district's administrative centre) by road. Kalchirburan is the nearest rural locality.

References 

Rural localities in Aurgazinsky District